Electric line may refer to:
Electrical wiring
Overhead lines that power a railway
Metra Electric Line, a commuter rail line serving the Chicago area
Wireline (cabling), a cabling technology where a current is sent to downhole logging tools in oil well exploration and completions